Beniferri is a town located in the Pobles de l'Oest district of the municipality of Valencia.

References

Towns in Spain
Populated places in the Province of Valencia
Geography of Valencia